Capita Centre, is now known as 9 Castlereagh St Sydney, is a skyscraper in Sydney, Australia. The building was designed by Harry Seidler & Associates in 1984 and completed in 1989. The building won Royal Australian Institute of Architects (NSW) merit award 1991.

The structural engineer was Miller, Milston & Ferris and the builder was Civil & Civic.

The building was designed to be the new company headquarters for City Mutual (Life Assurance Society Ltd). The land-locked site at 9 Castlereagh St was chosen because of its close proximity to the company's old landmark "City Mutual Building" at 60-66 Hunter St. City Mutual wanted their new headquarters to be lavish, so no expense was spared in the building design. In 1987, City Mutual changed its name to Capita. The building cost $200m and was opened in 1989.

The building is constructed of composite structural steel and concrete, with its support structures making it unique as it wears its structure on the outside as an outer skeleton. The external columns or lateral bracing truss are unique because they exist outside the core of the building. This building’s design is discussed in detail by Harry Seidler in a 1993 lecture (synchronised with illustrations nos 13-24) recorded by UK architectural journalist Monica Pidgeon whose film archive is available online. www.pidgeondigital.com

After Capita went into liquidation, the building at 9 Castlereagh St then became a tenanted commercial office tower. Because the tower was originally a company headquarters (with a diagonal hollow shaft to allow sun through the building), this building is one of the few Sydney prestige office towers which can provide small spaced floor plans. The building's lobby was refurbished in 2011 and won Australian Institute of Architects (NSW) Commercial Architecture Award Commendation 2012.

There is a porcelain mural by Lin Utzon in the ground floor lobby - installed in 1989. There was a second Lin Utzon sculpture "Capita 2" on the company executive floor. The last managing director of Capita (who later ran the company into liquidation) did not like the executive floor's design so arranged for the whole Seidler -designed executive floor on Level 31 to be gutted. Some architects from the Seidler office saved the Utzon artwork from being destroyed (traced wall paint outline and removed the porcelain cylinders). This Lin Utzon artwork featured at Museum of Sydney during a Harry Seidler exhibition in late 2014-15, and in 2016 was reassembled to Seidler office penthouse, Milsons Point. A Charles O. Perry sculpture "30” Helix Mobius Mace" (1988) was also part of Capita's executive floor on level 31, but when the executive floor was gutted, the sculpture was moved to the building basement. The Perry sculpture was later relocated to the building's entry lobby as part of the ground floor enhancements of 2011.

See also
 Skyscrapers in Sydney

References

External links
Emporis.com

Skyscrapers in Sydney
Office buildings completed in 1989
Harry Seidler buildings
Office buildings in Sydney
Skyscraper office buildings in Australia
Sydney central business district